Jeronne Martel Maymon (born March 6, 1991) is a former American professional basketball player who played for the Hapoel Tel Aviv B.C. of the Israeli Basketball Premier League. Jeronne retired on September 18, 2015 after undergoing his third knee surgery in a calendar year and his fifth since 2013.

References

1991 births
Living people
American expatriate basketball people in Israel
American men's basketball players
Basketball players from Wisconsin
Hapoel Tel Aviv B.C. players
Sportspeople from Madison, Wisconsin
Tennessee Volunteers basketball players
Forwards (basketball)